This is a list of the etymology of street names in the London district of Mayfair, in the City of Westminster. It utilises the generally accepted boundaries of Mayfair viz. Marble Arch/Cumberland Gate and Oxford Street to the north, Regent Street to the east, Piccadilly to the south and Park Lane to the west.

 Achilles Way – after the nearby Wellington as Achilles statue in Hyde Park
 Adam's Row – believed to be after John Adams, local land agent in the 18th century
 Air Street – believed to be a corruption of ‘Ayres’, after Thomas Ayre, a local brewer and resident in the 17th century
 Albany and Albany Courtyard – after Prince Frederick, Duke of York and Albany, who in 1791 purchased Melbourne House which stood on this site
 Albemarle Street – after the Christopher Monck, 2nd Duke of Albemarle, owner of Clarendon House which stood on this site in the late 17th century
 Aldford Street – after Aldford, a property on the Grosvenor family's Cheshire estates; it was formerly known as Chapel Street before 1886, as it led to the Grosvenor Chapel
 Archibald Mews – unknown; it was formerly John Court, after local landowner John, Lord Berkeley
 Audley Square, North Audley Street and South Audley Street – after Mary Davies, heiress to Hugh Audley, who married Sir Thomas Grosvenor, thereby letting the local land fall into the Grosvenors' ownership
 Avery Row – after Henry Avery, 18th century bricklayer who built this street over the Tyburn Brook, or possibly after Ebury, the ancient manor here
 Balderton Street – after local landowners the Grosvenors, who also owned land in Balderton, Cheshire; formerly George Street
 Balfour Mews and Balfour Place – after Eustace Balfour, surveyor for the Grosvenor estate 1890 – 1910
 Barlow Place – after either Thomas Barlow, builder and surveyor for the Grosvenor estate in the early 18th century or Arthur Balfour, politician and later Prime Minister in the early 20th century
 Berkeley Square and Berkeley Street – Berkeley House formerly stood here, home of John Berkeley, 3rd Baron Berkeley of Stratton in the late 17th century
 Binney Street – after Reverend Thomas Binney, local 19th century minister; formerly called Bird Street
 Blenheim Street – after Blenheim Palace, owned by John Churchill, 1st Duke of Marlborough, 17th – 18th century general
 Blackburne's Mews – after William Blackburne, local resident in the early 18th century
 Bloomfield Place – John Newson, who built the adjacent Bloomfield Flats, named them for his wife's maiden name
 Bolton Street – after Charles Powlett, Duke of Bolton, who owned this land when the street was built in 1699
 Bourdon Place and Bourdon Street – after the former Bourdon House, home of the Bourdon/Burden family in the early 18th century
 Boyle Street – after Richard Boyle, 3rd Earl of Burlington, local landowner in the 18th century
 Brick Street – this area was formerly a set of fields used for digging brick-earth
 Broadbent Street – after William Broadbent, physician to the royal family in the Victorian and Edwardian period, who lived nearby
 Brook Gate, Brook Street, Brook's Mews and Upper Brook Street – Brook Street marks the path of the former Tyburn Brook
 Brown Hart Gardens – this was formerly two streets prior to 1936 – Brown Street, after 18th century local bricklayer John Brown, and Hart Street, probably after a local inn or resident
 Bruton Lane, Bruton Place and Bruton Street – after Bruton, Somerset, where John Berkeley, 3rd Baron Berkeley of Stratton owned land
 Burlington Arcade, Burlington Gardens, New Burlington Mews, New Burlington Place, New Burlington Street and Old Burlington Street – after the local Burlington estate, property of the earls of Burlington
 Carlos Place – after Carlos I of Portugal; it was formerly Charles Street but was renamed in 1886 to avoid confusion with other streets of this name
 Carpenter Street
 Carrington Street – after 18th century local landowner Nathan Carrington
 Charles Street – after a Charles in the family of John Berkeley, 3rd Baron Berkeley of Stratton
 Chesterfield Gardens, Chesterfield Hill and Chesterfield Street – after Philip Stanhope, 4th Earl of Chesterfield, who owned a mansion nearby in the 18th century
 Clarges Mews and Clarges Street – after William (or Thomas) Clarges, local landowner in the 17th century
 Clifford Street – after Richard Boyle, 3rd Earl of Burlington, also Baron Clifford, after his ancestor Elizabeth Clifford
 Coach and Horses Yard – after the Burlington Arms pub here, formerly the Coach and Horses
 Conduit Street – after a former water conduit here leading to the city and owned by the Corporation of London from the 15th century
 Cork Street and Cork Street Mews – after Richard Boyle, 3rd Earl of Burlington, also 4th Earl of Cork
 Culross Street – thought to be after Culross in Fife; prior to 1899 it was Northrop Street, after a Welsh property owned by the Grosvenor family
 Cumberland Gate – after Prince William, Duke of Cumberland, brother of George III; it was formerly Tyburn Gate, after the Tyburn Brook
 Curzon Gate, Curzon Square and Curzon Street – after Nathaniel Curzon (and his family), local landowner in the 18th century
 Davies Mews and Davies Street – after Mary Davies, heiress to Hugh Audley, who married Sir Thomas Grosvenor, thereby letting the local land fall into the Grosvenors' ownership
 Deanery Mews and Deanery Street – this land was owned by Westminster Abbey in the 18th century; it was formerly known as Dean and Chapter Street
 Derby Street – after Derbyshire, home county of local landowners the Curzon family
 Dering Street and Dering Yard – unknown
 Down Street and Down Street Mews – after John Downes, local bricklayer in the 18th century
 Dover Street and Dover Yard – after Henry Jermyn, 1st Baron Dover, local leaseholder in the late 17th century
 Duke Street and Duke Yard – it is unknown precisely which duke, if any, this street commemorates
 Dunraven Street – after Windham Thomas Wyndham-Quin, 4th Earl of Dunraven and Mount-Earl, politician and soldier who lived near here
 Farm Street – this street was formerly part of Hay Hill farm
 Fitzmaurice Place – after John FitzMaurice, father of William Petty, 1st Marquess of Lansdowne who lived near here in the 18th century
 George Yard – probably after John George, local 18th century glazier and builder
 Gilbert Street – unknown; formerly James Street
 Globe Yard
 Grafton Street – after the Dukes of Grafton, who owned a town house near here in the 18th century
 Grantham Place – after John (or Thomas) Grantham, local builder in the 18th century
 Green Street – after John Green, local builder of the 18th century
 Grosvenor Gate, Grosvenor Hill, Grosvenor Square, Grosvenor Street and Upper Grosvenor Street – after the Grosvenors, former local landowners
 Half Moon Street – after a former inn near here of this name
 Hamilton Mews and Hamilton Place – built on land belonging to Mr Hamilton, ranger of Hyde Park during the reign King Charles II
 Hanover Square and Hanover Street – after the House of Hanover, reigning dynasty when the square and street were built in 1713
 Harewood Place – after Ahrwood House, residence of the Earls of Harewood in the 19th century
 Haunch of Venison Yard – after a former 18th century inn near here
 Hay Hill, Hay's Mews and Hill Street – after the Hay Hill farm which formerly stood here; the farm was originally ‘Aye farm’, after the nearby Aye Brook
 Heddon Street – after William Pulteney (later also Baron Heddon), local 18th century landowner
 Hertford Street – after a former local inn named after the Seymours, Marquesses of Hertford
 Jervis Court
 Jones Street – after William Jones, yeoman, who leased a large plot here in 1723
 Lancashire Court
 Lansdowne Row – former site of Lansdowne House, home of William Petty, 1st Marquess of Lansdowne in the 18th century
 Lees Place – after either Robert Lee (or Lees), owner of the Two Chairman pub which formerly stood here or one Thomas Barrett of Lee, Kent, 19th century builder
 Lumley Street – after Sibell Lumley, wife of Victor, Earl Grosvenor, local landowner
 Lynsey Way
 Maddox Street – after the local Maddox estate, purchased by William Maddox in the 1620s
 Marble Arch – after the Marble Arch erected here in 1851
 Market Mews – after the former Shepherd Market near here
 Mason's Arms Mews – after the nearby Mason's Arms pub
 Mayfair Place – after the May Fair that was formerly held here in the 17th – 18th centuries
 Mill Street – after a windmill that formerly stood here next to the Tyburn brook
 Mount Row, Mount Street and Mount Street Mews – built over the former Mount Field, from the former Oliver's Mount fortification built here by Oliver Cromwell during the English Civil War
 New Bond Street, Old Bond Street and Upper Bond Street – after Thomas Bond, member of the consortium that developed the local area in the late 17th century; ‘New’ comes from the extension of the then ‘Bond Street’ northwards in the early 18th century
 North Row – after its location as the northernmost street on the Grosvenor estate
 Oxford Circus and Oxford Street – after Edward Harley, 2nd Earl of Oxford and Earl Mortimer who owned much of the local estate; prior to this it was known as Tyburn Road, as it led to the Tyburn gibbet at what is now Marble Arch. Circus is a British term for a road junction; it was formerly Regent Circus, after Regent Street
 Park Lane, Old Park Lane and Park Street – after the nearby Hyde Park; Park Lane was formerly Tyburn Lane, after the Tyburn gibbet and stream, and Park Street was formerly Hyde Park Street
 Piccadilly, Piccadilly Circus and Piccadilly Place – after Piccadilly Hall, home of local tailor Robert Baker in the 17th century, believed to be named after the pickadils (collars/hem trimmings) which made his fortune. Circus is a British term for a road junction; it was laid out by John Nash in 1819
 Pitt's Head Mews – after a former pub on this site called the Pitt's Head, thought to be named after William Pitt the Elder
 Pollen Street – after the Pollen family, who inherited the estate from the Maddox family
 Princes Street – named in a generic sense in honour of the then reigning House of Hanover
 Providence Court – unknown
 Queen Street – when it was built in 1735 there was no reigning queen, so to which queen it refers, if any, is unknown
 Red Lion Yard
 Red Place – coined in Victorian times after the colour of the local buildings
 Reeves Mews – after Spelsant Reeves, local leaseholder in the 18th century
 Regent Street – made in the 1810s by John Nash and named after the Prince Regent, later George IV
 Rex Place – formerly King's Mews, it was renamed after the Latin term for ‘king’
 Royal Arcade – after Queen Victoria, who visited this arcade
 Sackville Street – after Captain Edward Sackville, tenant of a house on the west side of the street in 1675; it was formerly known as Stone Conduit Close
 Saddle Yard
 St Anselm's Place – former site of St Anselm's church, demolished 1938
 St George Street – originally George Street, after George I, reigning monarch when the street was built; the ‘St’ was later added to link it to the nearby St George's church
 Savile Row – after Dorothy Savile, Countess of Burlington and Countess of Cork, wife of Richard Boyle, 3rd Earl of Burlington, local landowner
 Sedley Place – named after Angelo Sedley, local 19th century furniture salesman
 Shepherd Close, Shepherd Market, Shepherd Place and Shepherd Street – after Edward Shepherd, local builder in the 18th century; Shepherd Place was built by his brother John Shepherd
 South Molton Lane and South Molton Street – unknown; South Molton Lane was formerly Poverty Lane
 South Street – after its location as the southernmost street on the Grosvenor estate
 Stafford Street – after Margaret Stafford, local leaseholder in the late 17th century
 Stanhope Gate and Stanhope Row – after Philip Stanhope, 4th Earl of Chesterfield, who owned a mansion nearby in the 18th century
 Stratton Street – after John Berkeley, 3rd Baron Berkeley of Stratton, local resident in the late 17th century
 Swallow Passage, Swallow Place and Swallow Street – after a field on this site owned by Thomas Swallow in the 1530s
 Tentereden Street – unknown
 Three Kings Yard – after a nearby inn, demolished 1879
 Tilney Street – after either John Tilney (or Tylney), who was granted this land in the 18th century or Ann Tilney, 18th century property owner; it was formerly Tripe Yard, after the butchery trade here
 Trebeck Street – after Reverend Trebeck, former rector of St George's on Hanover Square in the 18th century
 Tyburn Way – formerly the site of the Tyburn gallows, itself named after a deserted hamlet called Tiburne in the Domesday Book, meaning ‘boundary stream’
 Union Yard
 Vigo Street – after either the British victory at the Battle of Vigo Bay in 1702 or the capture of a Spanish vessel of this name in 1719
 Vine Street – after The Vine, an 18th-century public house, which in turn may have been named after a vineyard that existed at this location in Roman times
 Waverton Street – after Waverton, Cheshire, where local landowners the Grosvenors also held land
 Weighhouse Street – after the King's Weigh House Chapel, which moved here in 1891; before this it was known as Robert Street, after Robert Grosvenor, 1st Marquess of Westminster, and before that as Chandler Street after the local chandler trade
 White Horse Street – after a former inn of this name at this site, named for the Royal emblem of the House of Hanover
 Wood's Mews – after Richard Wood, who built this street in 1731
 Woodstock Street – after either Woodstock, Oxfordshire, location of to Blenheim Palace, home of John Churchill, 1st Duke of Marlborough, 17th – 18th century general or Thomas Woodstock, 18th century builder
 Yarmouth Place – after Francis Charles Seymour-Conway, 3rd Marquess of Hertford, Earl of Yarmouth who lived near here in the 19th century

References

Sources

*

Streets in the City of Westminster
Lists of United Kingdom placename etymology
Mayfair
Mayfair
City of Westminster
England geography-related lists